The 1922 Dayton Triangles season was their third in the league. The team improved on their previous output of 4–3–1, losing only three games. They finished seventh in the league.

Schedule

Standings

References

Dayton Triangles seasons
Dayton Triangles
Dayton Tri